Jacques E. Cesaire (born August 30, 1980) is a former American football defensive end and coach is the defensive line coach for the Houston Texans of the National Football League (NFL). He spent all nine years in the National Football League with the San Diego Chargers.

Early years
A native of Gardner and of Haitian descent, Cesaire started his high school football career in 1994 at nearby St. Bernard's High School in Fitchburg. However, he transferred to Gardner High School in 1996, and graduated there two years later. At Gardner, Cesaire lettered in football, basketball, and track and field.

Cesaire played football at Southern Connecticut State University from 1998 to 2002. In his final year, he was named the Northeast-10 Conference Defensive Lineman of the Year and was selected to the NCAA Division II All-America team by the American Football Coaches Association (AFCA). He also played in the Cactus Bowl.

Professional career
In 2003, Cesaire was signed by the San Diego Chargers as an undrafted free agent. He was one of many successful undrafted Chargers players that year, along with Stephen Cooper, Kris Dielman, Antonio Gates, and Kassim Osgood.

Cesaire's best years came between 2006 and 2008, when he totaled 8.5 sacks while playing a key role in the Chargers' defense. During these years, he was considered to be a significant team leader.

Cesaire was released on August 31, 2012, after nine seasons with the Chargers. In total, he started 66 games, recorded 220 tackles, and tallied 12.5 sacks.

On January 21, 2013, Cesaire announced his retirement. He spent his entire NFL career with the Chargers, winning five AFC West titles and reaching the AFC Championship Game during the 2007-08 playoffs.

Coaching career
After a year working as a sports analyst for local radio and television in the San Diego area, Cesaire began his coaching career in college football with the Toreros of the University of San Diego in 2015. He was the assistant defensive line coach under Dale Lindsey until 2019. The team won the Pioneer Football League in each year Cesaire coached there.

On February 7, 2020, Cesaire was hired as the assistant defensive line coach, under Sean McDermott, for the Buffalo Bills. The Bills won the AFC East title while he coached there.

On February 21, 2022, two weeks after the hiring of Lovie Smith, Cesaire was hired as the defensive line coach for the Houston Texans.

Personal life
Cesaire is married to Jill Murray, a fellow Southern Connecticut alum, with whom he has three children: Viviana, Desmond, and Cassius.

See also
List of Haitian Americans
List of people from Massachusetts

References

External links
San Diego Chargers bio

1980 births
Living people
People from Gardner, Massachusetts
Sportspeople from Worcester County, Massachusetts
Players of American football from Massachusetts
American sportspeople of Haitian descent
American football defensive ends
Southern Connecticut State Owls football players
San Diego Chargers players
San Diego Toreros football coaches
Buffalo Bills coaches
Houston Texans coaches